Hedmark is one of the 19 multi-member constituencies of the Storting, the national legislature of Norway. The constituency was established in 1921 following the introduction of proportional representation for elections to the Storting. It consists of the municipalities of Alvdal, Åmot, Åsnes, Eidskog, Elverum, Engerdal, Folldal, Grue, Hamar, Kongsvinger, Løten, Nord-Odal, Os, Rendalen, Ringsaker, Sør-Odal, Stange, Stor-Elvdal, Tolga, Trysil, Tynset and Våler in the county of Innlandet. The constituency currently elects six of the 169 members of the Storting using the open party-list proportional representation electoral system. At the 2021 parliamentary election it had 152,228 registered electors.

Electoral system
Hedmark currently elects six of the 169 members of the Storting using the open party-list proportional representation electoral system. Constituency seats are allocated by the County Electoral Committee using the Modified Sainte-Laguë method. Compensatory seats (seats at large) are calculated based on the national vote and are allocated by the National Electoral Committee using the Modified Sainte-Laguë method at the constituency level (one for each constituency). Only parties that reach the 4% national threshold compete for compensatory seats.

Election results

Summary

(Excludes compensatory seats. Figures in italics represent joint lists.)

Detailed

2020s

2021
Results of the 2021 parliamentary election held on 13 September 2021:

The following candidates were elected:
Tor André Johnsen (FrP); Emilie Enger Mehl (Sp); Anna Molberg (H); Nils Kristen Sandtrøen (Ap); Lise Selnes (Ap); Anette Trettebergstuen (Ap); and Trygve Slagsvold Vedum (Sp).

2010s

2017
Results of the 2017 parliamentary election held on 11 September 2017:

The following candidates were elected:
Karin Andersen (SV); Tor André Johnsen (FrP); Emilie Enger Mehl (Sp); Kristian Tonning Riise (H); Nils Kristen Sandtrøen (Ap); Anette Trettebergstuen (Ap); and Trygve Slagsvold Vedum (Sp).

2013
Results of the 2013 parliamentary election held on 8 and 9 September 2013:

The following candidates were elected:
Karin Andersen (SV); Gunnar Gundersen (H); Tor André Johnsen (FrP); Tone Sønsterud (Ap); Knut Storberget (Ap); Anette Trettebergstuen (Ap); and Trygve Slagsvold Vedum (Sp).

2000s

2009
Results of the 2009 parliamentary election held on 13 and 14 September 2009:

The following candidates were elected:
Karin Andersen (SV); Per Roar Bredvold (FrP); Thomas Breen (Ap); Gunnar Gundersen (H); Tone Sønsterud (Ap); 
Knut Storberget (Ap); Anette Trettebergstuen (Ap); and Trygve Slagsvold Vedum (Sp).

2005
Results of the 2005 parliamentary election held on 11 and 12 September 2005:

The following candidates were elected:
Karin Andersen (SV); Per Roar Bredvold (FrP); Sylvia Brustad (Ap); Eirin Faldet (Ap); Gunnar Gundersen (H); Knut Storberget (Ap); Anette Trettebergstuen (Ap); and Trygve Slagsvold Vedum (Sp).

2001
Results of the 2001 parliamentary election held on 9 and 10 September 2001:

The following candidates were elected:
Karin Andersen (SV); Per Roar Bredvold (FrP); Sylvia Brustad (Ap); Eirin Faldet (Ap); Ola D. Gløtvold (Sp); Bjørn Hernæs (H); Knut Storberget (Ap); and Åse Wisløff Nilssen (KrF).

1990s

1997
Results of the 1997 parliamentary election held on 15 September 1997:

The following candidates were elected:
Karin Andersen (SV); Per Roar Bredvold (FrP); Sylvia Brustad (Ap); Eirin Faldet (Ap); Grethe G. Fossum (Ap); Ola D. Gløtvold (Sp); Bjørn Hernæs (H); Einar Olav Skogholt (Ap); and Åse Wisløff Nilssen (KrF).

1993
Results of the 1993 parliamentary election held on 12 and 13 September 1993:

The following candidates were elected:
Sylvia Brustad (Ap); Eirin Faldet (Ap); Ola D. Gløtvold (Sp); Ragnhild Queseth Haarstad (Sp); Bjørn Hernæs (H); Sigbjørn Johnsen (Ap); Einar Olav Skogholt (Ap); and Magnar Sortåsløkken (SV).

1980s

1989
Results of the 1989 parliamentary election held on 10 and 11 September 1989:

The following candidates were elected:
Kjell Borgen (Ap); Sylvia Brustad (Ap);Eirin Faldet (Ap); Ragnhild Queseth Haarstad (Sp); Sigbjørn Johnsen (Ap); Johan C. Løken (H); Einar Olav Skogholt (Ap); and Magnar Sortåsløkken (SV).

1985
Results of the 1985 parliamentary election held on 8 and 9 September 1985:

The following candidates were elected:
Anne-Lise Bakken (Ap); Kjell Borgen (Ap); Eirin Faldet (Ap); Kjell Magne Fredheim (Ap); Ragnhild Queseth Haarstad (Sp); Sigbjørn Johnsen (Ap); Johan C. Løken (H); and Magnar Sortåsløkken (SV).

1981
Results of the 1981 parliamentary election held on 13 and 14 September 1981:

The following candidates were elected:
Anne-Lise Bakken (Ap); Kjell Borgen (Ap); Christian Erlandsen (H); Kjell Magne Fredheim (Ap); Ragnhild Queseth Haarstad (Sp-KrF-V); Sigbjørn Johnsen (Ap); Johan C. Løken (H); and Odvar Nordli (Ap).

1970s

1977
Results of the 1977 parliamentary election held on 11 and 12 September 1977:

The following candidates were elected:
Anne-Lise Bakken (Ap); Kjell Borgen (Ap); Christian Erlandsen (H); Kjell Magne Fredheim (Ap); Sigbjørn Johnsen (Ap); Ottar Landfald (Sp); Odvar Nordli (Ap); and Else Repål (Ap).

1973
Results of the 1973 parliamentary election held on 9 and 10 September 1973:

The following candidates were elected:
Kjell Magne Fredheim (Ap); Lars Holen (Ap); Ottar Landfald (Sp-KrF-V); Reidar T. Larsen (SV); Odvar Nordli (Ap); Johan Østby (Sp-KrF-V); Lars T. Platou (H); and Else Repål (Ap).

1960s

1969
Results of the 1969 parliamentary election held on 7 and 8 September 1969:

The following candidates were elected:
Kjell Magne Fredheim (Ap); Lars Holen (Ap); Harald Johan Løbak (Ap); Odvar Nordli (Ap); Johan Østby (Sp); Lars T. Platou (H); Else Repål (Ap); and Karstein Seland (Sp).

1965
Results of the 1965 parliamentary election held on 12 and 13 September 1965:

The following candidates were elected:
Otto Dahl (Ap); Lars Holen (Ap); Harald Johan Løbak (Ap); Odvar Nordli (Ap); Johan Østby (Sp); Lars T. Platou (H); Karstein Seland (Sp); and Haldis Tjernsberg (Ap).

1961
Results of the 1961 parliamentary election held on 11 September 1961:

The following candidates were elected:
Reidar Magnus Aamo (Ap), 57,495 votes; Otto Dahl (Ap), 57,479 votes; Karen Grønn-Hagen (Sp), 17,317 votes; Alv Kjøs (H), 9,691 votes; Harald Johan Løbak (Ap), 57,489 votes; Odvar Nordli (Ap), 57,480 votes; Ole Rømer Aagaard Sandberg (Sp), 17,314 votes; and Haldis Tjernsberg (Ap), 57,490 votes.

1950s

1957
Results of the 1957 parliamentary election held on 7 October 1957:

The following candidates were elected:
Reidar Magnus Aamo (Ap); Otto Dahl (Ap); Kristian Fjeld (Ap); Alv Kjøs (H); Oskar Lindberget (Ap); Harald Johan Løbak (Ap); Emil Løvlien (K); and Ole Rømer Aagaard Sandberg (Bp).

1953
Results of the 1953 parliamentary election held on 12 October 1953:

The following candidates were elected:
Reidar Magnus Aamo (Ap); Otto Dahl (Ap); Kristian Fjeld (Ap); Einar Frogner (Bp); Alv Kjøs (H); Oskar Lindberget (Ap); Harald Johan Løbak (Ap); and Emil Løvlien (K).

1940s

1949
Results of the 1949 parliamentary election held on 10 October 1949:

The following candidates were elected:
Reidar Magnus Aamo (Ap); Kristian Fjeld (Ap); Einar Frogner (Bp-H-V); Alv Kjøs (Bp-H-V); Oskar Lindberget (Ap); Harald Johan Løbak (Ap); and Johanne Samueline Pedersen (Ap).

1945
Results of the 1945 parliamentary election held on 8 October 1945:

As the list alliance was entitled to more seats contesting as an alliance than it was contesting as individual parties, the distribution of seats was as list alliance votes. The Bp-H list alliance's additional seat was allocated to the Conservative Party.

The following candidates were elected:
Kristian Fjeld (Ap); Einar Frogner (Bp); Arvid Johansen (Ap); Alv Kjøs (H); Harald Johan Løbak (Ap); Emil Løvlien (K); and Johanne Samueline Pedersen (Ap).

1930s

1936
Results of the 1936 parliamentary election held on 19 October 1936:

As the list alliance was entitled to more seats contesting as an alliance than it was contesting as individual parties, the distribution of seats was as list alliance votes. The Bp-H-V list alliance's additional seat was allocated to the Conservative Party.

The following candidates were elected:
Karsten Fonstad (Ap); Alv Kjøs (H); Oscar Nilssen (Ap); Olav Østby-Deglum (Bp); Olav Jørgen Sæter (Ap); Knut Sjøli (Ap); and Peder E. Vorum (Ap).

1933
Results of the 1933 parliamentary election held on 16 October 1933:

The following candidates were elected:
Lars Olsen Aukrust (Bp); Karsten Fonstad (Ap); Oscar Nilssen (Ap); Olav Østby-Deglum (Bp); Olav Jørgen Sæter (Ap); Knut Sjøli (Ap); and Peder E. Vorum (Ap).

1930
Results of the 1930 parliamentary election held on 20 October 1930:

The following candidates were elected:
Peter Thorvald Gaustad (H-FV); Kristian Lian (Ap); Arne Løfsgaard (Bp); Oscar Nilssen (Ap); Olav Østby-Deglum (Bp); Olav Jørgen Sæter (Ap); and Knut Sjøli (Ap).

1920s

1927
Results of the 1927 parliamentary election held on 17 October 1927:

The following candidates were elected:
Ole Ludvig Bærøe (H-FV); Arne Løfsgaard (Bp); Johan E. Mellbye (Bp); Oscar Nilssen (Ap); Olav Jørgen Sæter (Ap); Olav Scheflo (K); and Knut Sjøli (Ap).

1924
Results of the 1924 parliamentary election held on 21 October 1924:

The following candidates were elected:
Kristen Andersen Aalborg (B); Johan E. Mellbye (Bp); Oscar Nilssen (Ap); Eivind Petershagen (K); Olav Jørgen Sæter (Ap); Kristoffer Skraastad (H-FV); and Otto Halvorsen Svenkerud (H-FV).

1921
Results of the 1921 parliamentary election held on 24 October 1921:

The following candidates were elected:
Thorbjørn Gjølstad (H-FV); Johannes Johnsen Grue (V); Wollert Konow (H-FV); Johan E. Mellbye (L); Oscar Nilssen (Ap); Olav Jørgen Sæter (Ap); and Knut Sjøli (Ap).

Notes

References

Storting constituency
Storting constituencies
Storting constituencies established in 1921